The Izu catshark (Scyliorhinus tokubee) is a species of catshark, family Scyliorhinidae, found only in the waters around Japan, at depths down to 100 m (328 ft). It can grow up to a length of 41 cm (16.1 in).

References

Izu catshark
Fish of Japan
Taxa named by Shigeru Shirai
Taxa named by Souichi Hagiwara
Taxa named by Kazuhiro Nakaya
Izu catshark